Carl Joseph Truscott  is a security expert and was the sixth Director of the Bureau of Alcohol, Tobacco, Firearms and Explosives in the United States Department of Justice under George W. Bush, a position he held from 2004 to 2006.

Education
Truscott earned a Bachelor of Science degree in Criminal Justice from the University of Delaware in 1979, and attended an executive program at Harvard University.

Career
Truscott began his law enforcement career in 1980 as an Investigator for the New Jersey Department of Law and Public Safety.

Soon after, he joined the United States Secret Service where he served for 22 years rising to the position Assistant Director of the Office of Protective Research.

Truscott served as Special Agent in Charge of the Presidential Protective Division and was responsible for the overall security of the President, the First Family and the White House. He served two tours of duty in the Presidential Protective Division at the White House and protected Presidents Ronald Reagan, George H. W. Bush, William J. Clinton and George W. Bush.

Bureau of Alcohol, Tobacco, Firearms and Explosives
Attorney General John Ashcroft  appointed Truscott head of ATF in 2004.

Truscott was the subject of an Inspector General's Office Investigation in early 2006 in regards to lavish spending and misuse of agency resources.  He resigned six months later.

ASERO Worldwide

Truscott is currently a senior executive at ASERO Worldwide, a security consulting firm.

References

External links
 Report of Investigation Concerning Alleged Mismanagement and Misconduct by Carl J. Truscott, Former Director of the Bureau of Alcohol, Tobacco, Firearms and Explosives Report of Investigation Concerning Alleged Mismanagement and Misconduct by Carl J. Truscott, Former Director of the Bureau of Alcohol, Tobacco, Firearms and Explosives

Living people
University of Delaware alumni
Harvard University alumni
American law enforcement officials
Heads of United States federal agencies
ATF agents
United States Secret Service agents
Directors of the Bureau of Alcohol, Tobacco, Firearms and Explosives
George W. Bush administration controversies
Year of birth missing (living people)